The Casiquiare river is a distributary of the upper Orinoco flowing southward into the Rio Negro, in Venezuela, South America. As such, it forms a unique natural canal between the Orinoco and Amazon river systems. It is the world's largest river of the kind that links two major river systems, a so-called bifurcation. The area forms a water divide, more dramatically at regional flood stage.

Etymology
The name Casiquiare, first used in that form by Manuel Román, likely derives from the Ye'kuana language name of the river, Kashishiwadi.

Discovery

In 1744 a Jesuit priest named Manuel Román, while ascending the Orinoco River in the region of La Esmeralda, met some Portuguese slave-traders from the settlements on the Rio Negro. The Portuguese insisted they were not in Spanish territory but on a tributary of the Amazon; they invited Román back with them to prove their claim. He accompanied them on their return, by way of the Casiquiare canal, and afterwards retraced his route to the Orinoco. Along the way, he made first contact with the Ye'kuana people, whom he enlisted to help in his journey. Charles Marie de La Condamine, seven months later, was able to give to the Académie française an account of Father Román's voyage, and thus confirm the existence of this waterway, first reported by Father Acuña in 1639.

Little credence was given to Román's statement until it was verified, in 1756, by the Spanish Boundary-line Commission of José Yturriaga and Solano. In 1800 German scientist Alexander von Humboldt and French botanist Aimé Bonpland explored the river. During a 1924–25 expedition, Alexander H. Rice Jr. of Harvard University traveled up the Orinoco, traversed the Casiquiare canal, and descended the Rio Negro to the Amazon at Manaus. It was the first expedition to use aerial photography and shortwave radio for mapping of the region. In 1968 the Casiquiare was navigated by an SRN6 hovercraft during a National Geographic expedition.

Geography

However, as it gains in volume from the very numerous tributary streams, large and small, that it receives en route, its velocity increases, and in the wet season reaches , even  in certain stretches. The volume of water the Casiquiare captures from the Orinoco is small in comparison to what it accumulates in its course. Nevertheless, the geological processes are ongoing, and evidence points to a slow and gradual increase in the size of Casiquiare. It is likely that stream capture is in progress, i.e. what currently is the uppermost Orinoco basin, including Cunucunuma River, eventually will be entirely diverted by the Casiquiare into the Amazon basin.

In the dry season, it has shallows, and is obstructed by sandbanks, a few rapids and granite rocks. Its shores are densely wooded, and the soil more fertile than that along the Rio Negro. The general slope of the plains through which the canal runs is south-west, but those of the Rio Negro slope south-east.

The Casiquiare is not a sluggish canal on a flat tableland, but a great, rapid river which, if its upper waters had not found contact with the Orinoco, perhaps by cutting back, would belong entirely to the Negro branch of the Amazon.

To the west of the Casiquiare, there is a much shorter and easier portage between the Orinoco and Amazon basins, called the isthmus of Pimichin, which is reached by ascending the Temi branch of the Atabapo River, an affluent of the Orinoco. Although the Temi is somewhat obstructed, it is believed that it could easily be made navigable for small craft. In the early 20th century, it was much used for the transit of large canoes, which were hauled across it from the Temi River and reached the Rio Negro by a little stream called the Pimichin.

Hydrographic divide

The Casiquiare canal – Orinoco River hydrographic divide is a representation of the hydrographic water divide that delineates the separation between the Orinoco Basin and the Amazon Basin. (The Orinoco Basin flows west–north–northeast into the Caribbean; the Amazon Basin flows east into the western Atlantic in the extreme northeast of Brazil.)

Essentially the river divide is a west-flowing, upriver section of Venezuela's Orinoco River with an outflow to the south into the Amazon Basin. This named outflow is the Casiquiare canal, which, as it heads downstream (southerly), picks up speed and also accumulates water volume.

The greatest manifestation of the divide is during floods. During flood stage, the Casiquiare's main outflow point into the Rio Negro is supplemented by an overflow that is a second, and more minor, entry river bifurcation into the Rio Negro and upstream from its major, common low-water entry confluence with the Rio Negro. At flood, the river becomes an area flow source, far more than a narrow confined river.

The simplest description (besides the entire area-floodplain) of the water divide is a "south-bank Orinoco River strip" at the exit point of the Orinoco, also the origin of the Casiquiare canal. However, during the Orinoco's flood stage, that single, simply defined "origin of the canal" is turned into a region, and an entire strip along the southern bank of the Orinoco River.

See also
Crypturellus casiquiare, the barred tinamou.
List of unusual drainage systems

References

Sources

VARESCHI, Volkmar. Orinoco arriba. A través de Venezuela siguiendo a Humboldt. Caracas: Ediciones Lectura, 1959

Notes

External links

 The point where the Casiquiare bifurcates from the Orinoco, on Google Maps
 Wikimapia satellite image displaying locations of both the beginning (principio) and the end (desague) of the Casiquiare Canal.

Orinoco basin
Tributaries of the Rio Negro (Amazon)
Rivers of Venezuela
Biosphere reserves of Venezuela
River bifurcations